Sydney University Soccer Football Club (SUSFC) is an Australian semi-professional association football club based in Sydney. Founded in 1946, the club has over 40 constituent teams with over 600 players competing in the Football New South Wales National Premier Leagues (NPL), North West Sydney Women's Football, the Eastern Suburbs Football Association and the Canterbury District Soccer Football Association. The Club is run by an executive committee elected annually by members.

SUSFC's main home ground is University of Sydney No. 2 Oval, a multi-use venue located in the University of Sydney. The club also plays on St. Andrew's Oval, St. John's Oval and University No.1 Oval. The club's NPL Youth Teams play their home games at Arlington Oval.  The Club is a member of Sydney Uni Sport and Fitness. Its headquarters are located in The Arena Sports Centre, Western Avenue.

Current squad
2019 NPL 3 Men’s Squad  Updated 22 February 2019.

Rivalries
UNSW Football – The intervarsity rivalry between Sydney's two biggest universities is mostly based on the perceived inferiority of the University of New South Wales as an educational institution. The Clubs compete regularly in the ESFA competitions and compete for the Kennard Cup each year.

External links
 Official website
 Sydney Uni Sport and Fitness
 Football New South Wales
 Canterbury District Soccer Football Association
 Eastern Suburbs Football Association
 North West Sydney Womens Football

Soccer clubs in Sydney
Sport at the University of Sydney
University soccer clubs in Australia
Association football clubs established in 1946
1946 establishments in Australia